This list of tallest buildings and structures in Bristol ranks skyscrapers and other structures by height in Bristol, United Kingdom, that are at least 40 metres tall.

Complete and under construction

An equal sign (=) following a rank indicates the same height between two or more buildings.
{| class="wikitable sortable"
|-
! Rank
! Name
! Height (m)
! Image
! Floors
! Year
! Primary use
! Notes
|-
|-bgcolor="#BCD4E6"
|1
|Castle Park View
|98
|
|26
|2022
|Residential
|Completed 
|-
| 2=
| St. Mary Redcliffe
| 80
|
| 3
| 1442 
| Religion
| (Previous tallest building in Bristol between 1442-1446, until the tower collapsed in 1446. The tower was rebuilt in 1872. Commonly misquoted as 292 feet (89m). 
|-
| 2=
| Castlemead
| 80
|
| 19
| 1981
| Office
| 
|-
| 4
|Wills Memorial Building
| 68
|
| 5
| 1925 
| Education
| (Renovated 2006)
|-
| 5=
|Eclipse (also known as Harvey Nichols Tower)
| 65
|
| 17
| 2007
| Retail/Residential
|-
|5=
|Christ Church, Clifton Down
| 65
|
| 1
| 1885
| Religion
|
|-
| 7=
|One Redcliff Street
| 64
|
| 16
| 1964
| Office
|
|-
|7=
| Beacon Tower (formerly Colston Tower)
| 64
|
| 18
| 1973
| Office
|
|-
| 9
| Fusion Tower (Formerly Froomsgate House)
| 63
|
| 17
| 1971
| Student Accommodation
| (Renovated 2017)
|-
| 10
| Radisson Blu Bristol (formerly Bristol & West Building)
| 61
|
| 17
| 1967 
| Hotel
| (Renovated 2008)
|-
| 11=
|Premier Inn Bristol City Centre (formerly Avon House)
| 60
|
| 18
| 1972
| Hotel
|
|-
|11=
|St. Nicholas' Church
| 60
|
| 1
| 1769 
| Religion
| (former tallest building until 1872)
|-
|13
|One Bristol (formerly Lewins Mead)
|59
|
|15
|1972 
|Residential
|(Renovated 2017)
|-
|-bgcolor="#BCD4E6"
|14
|Assembly Building A
|58
|
|11
|2022
|Office
|In 2020 BT Group announced they would take occupancy of the whole building upon completion. 
|-
|-
|-bgcolor="#BCD4E6"
|15
|Assembly Building C
|57
|
|12
|2023
|Office
| Topped out
|-
|-bgcolor="#BCD4E6"
|16
|Millwrights Place
|52
|
|14
|2023
|Residential
|Topped out
|-
|17
|New Bridewell Tower
|49
|
|16
|2017
| Student
| 
|-
|
|-bgcolor="#BCD4E6"
|18
|Bath Road
|49
|
|15+2*
|2023
|Residential
|The development consists of two further floors below streetlevel facing the river. The height including these two floors is 56.6m.
|-
|19
|The Eye
|
|
|13
|2012
| Residential
|
|}

Proposed and approved

Redcatch Quarter              june 2023

Cancelled

See also
 Buildings and architecture of Bristol

References

External links 

Lists of tallest buildings in the United Kingdom
Tallest